An accounting machine, or bookkeeping machine or recording-adder, was generally a calculator and printer combination tailored for a specific commercial activity such as billing, payroll, or ledger.  Accounting machines were widespread from the early 1900s to 1980s, but were rendered obsolete by the availability of low-cost computers such as the IBM PC.

This type of machine is generally distinct from unit record equipment (some unit record machines were also called accounting machines).

List of Vendors/Accounting Machines 

 Burroughs Sensimatic
 Burroughs Sensitronic
 Burroughs B80
 Burroughs E103
 Burroughs Computer F2000
 Burroughs L500
 Burroughs E1400 Electronic Computing/Accounting Machine with Magnetic Striped Ledger
 Dalton Adding Machine Company
 Electronics Corporation of America: Magnefile-B
 Electronics Corporation of America: Magnefile-D
 Elliott-Fisher
 Federal Adding Machines
 IBM 632
 IBM 858 Cardatype Accounting Machine 
 IBM 6400 Series
 Laboratory for Electronics: The Inventory Machine II (TIM-II)
 Monroe Calculator Company: Model 200
 Monroe Calculator Company: Synchro-Monroe President
 Monroe Calculator Company: Monrobot IX
 NCR Post-Tronic Bookkeeping Machine - Class 29
 NCR Compu-Tronic Accounting Machine
 NCR Accounting Machine - Class 33
 NCR Window Posting Machine - Class 42
 Olivetti: General Bookkeeping Machine (GBM)
 J. B. Rea Company: READIX, c. 1955
 Sundstrand Adding Machines
 Underwood ELECOM 50 "The First Electronic Accounting Machine" 
 Underwood ELECOM 125, 125 FP (File Processor), 1956

See also

Unit record equipment

References

Programmable calculators
Early computers
Mechanical calculators